Tropical Storm Elena was a weak tropical storm that moved ashore along Texas in the 1979 Atlantic hurricane season. The sixth tropical storm of the season, Elena developed from a tropical wave to the south of Louisiana on August 29. It tracked generally west-northwest, strengthening little before making landfall on Matagorda Island on September 1 as a minimal tropical storm; the storm quickly dissipated over land. Elena dropped moderate rainfall along its path, causing two direct deaths in Houston from drowning; storm damage was minor, amounting to less than $10 million (1979 USD, $28 million 2007 USD). Lightning from the storm set fire to an oil supertanker in Houston, causing three indirect deaths and 13 injuries.

Meteorological history

A tropical wave moved off the coast of Africa on August 17. It tracked westward, passing through the Lesser Antilles on August 22, and on August 27 the weak wave axis crossed through Florida. A tropical disturbance organized along the wave axis, with ship and buoy reports indicating the development of a low-level circulation by August 29. With a ridge of high pressure located over the southeastern United States, the depression continued tracking generally westward and intensified into Tropical Storm Elena late on August 30. Elena was the sixth tropical storm of the season, as Hurricane Frederic attained tropical storm status six hours prior to Elena.

Unfavorable northerly vertical wind shear persisted through much of Elena's duration, which prohibited the development of convection. An approaching frontal trough weakened the high pressure system to its north, which resulted in Elena turning northwestward toward the Texas coastline. The storm remained poorly organized, failing to strengthen further, and on September 1 it made landfall on Matagorda Island as a minimal tropical storm. The cyclone rapidly weakened after moving ashore, and early on September 2 Elena degenerated into a remnant low pressure area over southeastern Texas. Trapped between two high pressure systems, the remnant mid-level circulation drifted southwestward just inland for several days before dissipating on September 6.

Impact

As Elena was upgraded to a tropical storm, the National Hurricane Center issued a gale warning from Port O'Connor, Texas to Morgan City, Louisiana; these remained in effect until the storm moved ashore. As Elena moved ashore, it produced a  storm tide at Galveston and Baytown. Near Houston,  of precipitation was reported, which caused two drownings from flooding. Overall storm damage was fairly minor, totaling to less than $10 million (1979 USD, $28 million 2007 USD).

At a dock owned by Shell Oil Company in Deer Park near Houston, a lightning bolt from thunderstorms of Elena struck the oil supertanker SS Chevron Hawaii. The lightning started a fire on the ship, which expanded and wrecked one adjacent barge and burned nearby docks. The ship was nearly split in half from the lightning strike, and oil seeped into Houston Ship Channel for several hours. Firefighters combated the fire on the tanker in boats, but their efforts were hindered due to unsettled weather from Elena, as well as unsafe water to travel through. The fire caused three deaths and 13 injuries, and damage related to the incident totaled $27 million (1979 USD, $76 million 2007 USD).

See also

 List of Texas hurricanes (1950–79)
 Other tropical cyclones named Elena

References

External links
 Satellite loop of David, Elena, Frederic, and Gloria

Elena
Elena (1979)
Elena (1979)
Elena (1979)
1979 natural disasters in the United States